Galsandorjiin Batbileg (born 29 February 1952) is a Mongolian boxer. He competed in the men's lightweight event at the 1980 Summer Olympics.

References

External links
 

1952 births
Living people
Mongolian male boxers
Olympic boxers of Mongolia
Boxers at the 1980 Summer Olympics
Place of birth missing (living people)
Boxers at the 1974 Asian Games
Boxers at the 1978 Asian Games
Boxers at the 1982 Asian Games
Asian Games competitors for Mongolia
Lightweight boxers
20th-century Mongolian people
21st-century Mongolian people